The 2020–21 season of the Frauen-Bundesliga was the 31st season of Germany's premier women's football league. It ran from 4 September 2020 to 6 June 2021.

Seven time champion 1. FFC Frankfurt joined forces with Eintracht Frankfurt and competes under their name.

Bayern Munich won their third title.

The fixtures were announced on 27 July 2020.

Effects of the COVID-19 pandemic
On 31 August 2020, the DFB Executive Committee decided to extend the use of five substitutions in matches to the 2020–21 season, which was implemented at the end of the previous season to lessen the impact of fixture congestion caused by the COVID-19 pandemic. The use of five substitutes, based on the decision of competition organisers, had been extended by IFAB until 2021.

Teams

Team changes

Stadiums

League table

Results

Top scorers

Notes

References

External links
Weltfussball.de
DFB.de

2020-21
2020–21 in German women's football leagues